Aamir Liaquat Hussain (5 July 1971 – 9 June 2022) was a Pakistani politician, columnist and television host. Hussain was a top ranking TV anchor and was listed three times in The 500 influential Muslims worldwide, and was among 100 popular personalities of Pakistan. He was criticized on media numerous times due to his controversial comments about superstars. He was a member of the National Assembly of Pakistan from August 2018 to June 2022.

Previously, he was a member of the National Assembly from 2002 to 2007 and served as the Minister of State for Religious Affairs from 2004 to 2007 in the federal cabinet of Prime Minister Shaukat Aziz.
He died on 9 June 2022 in his room at his residence due to suffocation, as per police his house was full of smoke due to a generator.

Early life and education
Hussain was born on 5 July 1971 in Karachi to politician Sheikh Liaquat Hussain and columnist Mahmooda Sultana.

Educational qualifications 
In an interview, Hussain said he received his Bachelor of Medicine, Bachelor of Surgery (MBBS) degree from Liaquat Medical College Jamshoro in 1995, and Doctor of Philosophy (PhD) in Islamic Studies in 2002 by a now known degree mill, Trinity College and University (based in Spain but incorporated in Dover, Delaware). He has also said that he gained a degree of Master of Arts in Islamic Studies in 2002 from the Trinity College and University.

In 2006, the Higher Education Commission of Pakistan declared the BA degree in Islamic Studies of Hussain obtained from Trinity College and University as not recognized and fake. In 2003, The Guardian reported this university as a scam where one could buy a degree for as cheaply as £150 within 28 days. The University of Karachi declared his BA degree as fake earlier in 2005. Hussain declared his BA degree to the election commission of Pakistan while filing his nomination forms for the 2002 Pakistani general elections. It was reported that Hussain had purchased his degrees from Trinity College and University to become eligible for contesting the elections. In 2002, it was made compulsory for contestants of elections for seats in the Provincial and National Assemblies of Pakistan to hold at least a bachelor's degree.

Hussain's claim to have received an MBBS degree from Liaquat Medical College Jamshoro in 1995 was also falsified based on the fact that if he did have one, he would not need any fake bachelors, masters or doctorate degrees to contest the 2002 general elections. It was also noted that one cannot study at two different faculties at a same time since Hussain claimed to have both his MBBS degree in 1995 and BA in Islamic Studies from Trinity College in 1995.

In 2012, it was reported that Hussain appeared as a candidate for a Bachelor of Arts degree at the University of Karachi from where he graduated in 2008. He was later enrolled in Federal Urdu University of Arts, Science & Technology in 2010 from where he received his master's degree in Islamic Studies, but according to officials there, Hussain never attended a class or sat any exams. The officials said that the admission form of Hussain was initially submitted with the photograph of another person and was later replaced with the photograph of Hussain. It was also reported that Hussain did not himself sit the semester exams.

In 2015, it was reported that Hussain had acquired a fake degree from Ashwood University. According to the Federal Investigation Agency, his profile was noted in Axact's main server. Hussain confessed that he purchased the fake degree from Ashwood University for $1136.

Political career

MQM 
Hussain was elected as the Member of the National Assembly of Pakistan for the first time in the 2002 Pakistani general election on the ticket of the Muttahida Qaumi Movement from NA-249 (Karachi-XI) constituency and was appointed Minister of State for Religious Affairs and Zakat and Ushar Division in September 2004 in the Shaukat Aziz cabinet. As the junior minister of Religious Affairs, Hussain asked religious scholars from Pakistan to issue a 'Fatwa' regarding suicide bombings in May 2005. In June 2005, he was attacked by enraged youths during his visit to Jamia Binoria. Police however denied that any incident of manhandling of Hussain had taken place and said that the crowd only chanted slogans. Hussain was the minister of state for Religious Affairs until July 2007, when his party asked him to resign from his position as Minister, and from his seat as a member of the National Assembly. According to an official statement, the party was unhappy with statements made by Hussain against Salman Rushdie. In 2007, he resigned from politics. Later in 2008, MQM also expelled him from the party.

He was the founder of the Memhooda Sultana Foundation. From 2013 to 2015, an annual publication The 500 Most Influential Muslims by Royal Islamic Strategic Studies Centre in Jordan included Hussain in their list. In August 2016, after the attack on media houses by MQM workers and the arrest of MQM leaders, Hussain was also taken into custody by Sindh Rangers.
In February 2017, an Anti-Terrorism Court in Pakistan instructed the authorities to put the name of Hussain on the Exit Control List, after Hussain was charged with facilitation of hate speech but police failed to produce Hussain in court hearings.

PTI 
Hussain joined Pakistan Tehreek-e-Insaf (PTI) in March 2018.

He was re-elected to the National Assembly as a PTI candidate for constituency NA-245 (Karachi East-IV) in the 2018 Pakistani general election.

On 4 October 2021, he resigned from his National Assembly of Pakistan's seat and left Pakistan Tehreek-e-Insaf.

Return to MQM 
On 6, April 2022, Hussain tweeted “I am extremely embarrassed [for betraying] MQM leader Altaf Hussain. I am unable to even look into his eyes.” hinting towards his return to MQM. On many occasions, Aamir Liaquat had hailed Altaf Hussain as his “leader” and even advocated for resumption of government-level talks with Altaf to end his self-imposed exile.

TV career
Hussain was a radio broadcaster on FM101. He is also known for hosting Ramadan transmissions; for Suhur and Iftar, for many years. He started his television career at Pakistan Television Corporation but was fired shortly thereafter. He joined Geo TV as founding member in 2001 where he hosted religious program Aalim Online. In 2010, Hussain left Geo TV and joined ARY Digital Network as managing director of ARY Qtv and as executive director of ARY Digital. He hosted religious program Aalim Aur Aalam there. He then hosted Pehchan Ramazan in 2012, after rejoining Geo TV, and Amaan Ramazan in 2013. In January 2014, he became the vice president of Geo TV, and hosted game show Inaam Ghar.

In June 2014, he joined Express Media Group as president and Group Editor of religious content on Daily Express, and hosted Pakistan Ramazan. Hussain then rejoined Geo TV and hosted Subh-e-Pakistan from November 2014, and also became president of Geo Entertainment in November 2015. He then joined BOL media group in 2016, and started hosting current affairs talk show Aisay Nahi Chalay Ga. There, he hosted Ramazan Mein BOL in 2017, during which he also started hosting a game show; Game Show Aisay Chalay Ga. He left BOL in November 2017. In 2019, he joined Pakistan Television Corporation.

In January 2016, it was reported that Hussain would make Pakistani film debut in an upcoming film of Syed Noor, alongside Saima Noor as lead cast. In April 2019, he announced that he will play Burhan Wani in Ayub Khoso's upcoming film, based on the Kashmir issue. In April 2020, he started hosting a game show called "Jeeway Pakistan" which airs on Express TV.

Controversies
In 2008, Hussain in his TV special, Khatmay Nabuwat, criticised the Ahmadi Community founder, Mirza Ghulam Ahmad. The guest scholars in the show declared that anyone associated with the Ahmadi group deserve to get murdered on account of blasphemy. Within two days, two prominent people from the Ahmadi community were killed, one of them being a physician and another being a community leader.

In 2010, Hussain claimed in his TV show that the recent losses in cricket matches of Pakistani Cricket team were due to their new shoe soles being green. With green being the color of Pakistani flag and the Dome of Muhammad's tomb, the green soles were supposedly disrespectful towards Islam, and apparently the team was being divinely punished. Hussain claimed that this was a matter of faith. He was subsequently criticised for his views in the media.

In 2011, a compilation of behind-the-scenes footage videos were leaked online, showing Hussain using various profanities on the set of his show. In the same video, he is also shown taking a rape related question lightly, mocking his religious guests, spontaneously singing Indian tunes and referring to Bollywood rape scenes. In his defence, Hussain accused the Geo TV of creating the alleged fake video in order to tarnish his credibility, and stated that the video must have been edited and dubbed by "masters of synchronization". However, The New York Times reported that Hussain himself said "It was my lighter side".

In 2013, Hussain was criticised for giving out abandoned infants to parents who wanted to adopt babies in Amaan Ramazan transmission. The parents were chosen after background checks were done by the Chhipa association beforehand, and then the baby was handed over to them during the show. Child welfare advocates expressed concern that the lack of confidentiality could expose the children and their families to teasing and stigma in the future.

In 2014, a religious cleric in a TV show hosted by Hussain declared Ahmadis the enemies of Islam and Hussain responded by nodding his head in affirmation while the audience burst into applause. The guest cleric went on to use further derogatory language against the Ahmadis for some minutes while the TV show host clapped in appreciation Within five days of the show, an Ahmadi man, Luqman Ahmad Shehzad, was gunned down in Gujranwala. This was the second time that Hussain's show had been linked to attacks on Ahmadis.

In June 2016, Pakistan Electronic Media Regulatory Authority (PEMRA) barred Hussain from hosting his Ramadan show Inaam Ghar for three days on Geo Entertainment, which showed a reenactment by the show's host of a girl committing suicide.

In January 2017, a social activist and lawyer Jibran Nasir filed a complaint with PEMRA alleging Hussain of running a "malicious, defamatory and life endangering campaign" against him. The same month, Hussain also claimed that Om Puri was murdered. Following which the PEMRA banned Hussain and his programme Aisay Nahi Chalay Ga on BOL News for preaching hate.

In March 2017, Amnesty International slammed the Government of Pakistan for not taking action against Hussain for endangering the lives of journalists, and bloggers, and social activists and urged Interior Minister of Pakistani Nisar Ali Khan to take immediate steps. Later in the month, PEMRA issued a notification against Hussain, directing him to apologise on air to the viewers for hate speech.

On 12 December 2017, it was announced that Hussain will be returning to television through 24 News HD, however, on 13 December, he was banned by PEMRA from all forms of media over hate speech allegations. The ban was lifted by the Supreme Court on 7 February 2018.

On 26 May 2018, PEMRA again banned Hussain after creating controversy related to religious organization Jamiat Ahle Hadith and Zakir Naik.

In May 2020, Hussain apologised for his comments on the deaths of Indian actors Sridevi and Irrfan Khan.

In May 2021, Hussain was once again a subject of controversy over his performance of "Nagin Dance" (Dance moves mimicking snake) during his evening special Ramazan transmission.

Personal life
Hussain had married thrice. He had two children with his first wife, Syeda Bushra Aamir. In June 2018, he confirmed his second marriage to Syeda Tuba Anwar. This marriage lasted for around three years, In February 2022 Amir married 18 year old Syeda Dania Shah. In May 2022, his third wife Syeda Dania Shah filed for divorce, after three months of marriage.

Death
Aamir Liaquat Hussain died on 9 June 2022 in Karachi. According to a servant, he heard Liaquat screaming in pain from his locked room.

After enquiring and receiving no reply from him, the servant broke down the door and found him lying on the floor unresponsive. He was immediately rushed to Agha Khan Hospital whilst fighting for his life where doctors pronounced him dead confirming that he had already died prior to arrival there. Police suspected that the cause of death was suffocating due to gases from a household generator, however the official cause of death has not been confirmed yet. Foul play has also  not been ruled out in respect of his death. His funeral prayer was held on Friday June 10, 2022 and led by his son Ahmed Aamir. He was laid to rest at Abdullah Shah Ghazi graveyard.

On 18 June 2022, a local court ordered his exhumation for postmortem examination.

Later in December 2022, FIA arrested his third wife, Dania Shah, for the misconduct of leaking his private data on social media.

Publications
Hussain's publications include:
Merī āvāz sāre zamāne kī ṣadā hai, ,1989, 64 p. Patriotic poetry.
Islam and terrorism : an historical and theological enquiry, ، 2002, 142 p.
Hamārī mān̲ K̲h̲adīja tul Kubrá, ، 2009, 900 p. On the life and eminence of Khadījah, d. ca. 619, first wife of Prophet Muhammad, d. 632.
Lāʼūḍ ispīkar, ، 2009, 2 volumes. Collection of articles on social and political conditions of Pakistan; published from 2005 to 2008 in Daily Jang, Rawalpindi, Pakistan.
Ās̲ār-i qiyāmat, ، 2010, 2 volumes. On the Judgment Day in Islam.

References

External links

1971 births
2022 deaths
Pakistani Muslims
Muhajir people
Pakistani television hosts
Geo News newsreaders and journalists
Pakistan Tehreek-e-Insaf MNAs
Politicians from Karachi
Pakistani game show hosts
People who fabricated academic degrees
ARY Digital people
Pakistani MNAs 2002–2007
BOL Network people
Pakistani investigative journalists
Muttahida Qaumi Movement MNAs
Pakistani MNAs 2018–2023
Pakistan Television Corporation people
Islamic television preachers
Critics of Ahmadiyya